Marijan Bradvić (8 December 1948 – 23 February 2019) was a Croatian footballer who played primarily in Yugoslavia, and in North America.

Playing career 
Bradvić began playing football in 1964 at the youth level with Dinamo Zagreb and subsequently signed a professional in 1968. In his debut season, he was loaned to HNK Rijeka, of the Yugoslav Second League where he won promotion to the Yugoslav First League in 1969. After touring the United States and Canada in 1970 the club decided to loan Bradvic to Toronto Croatia in the National Soccer League, where he won the NSL Championship in 1971. In 1975, he played in the North American Soccer League with the Toronto Metros-Croatia, where he appeared in nine matches and recorded three goals. He had another stint with Toronto in 1977. He returned to Yugoslavia in 1977 to have a stint with NK Jedinstvo Bihać, and with Dinamo in 1978. In 1981, he played indoor soccer with the Buffalo Stallions in the Major Indoor Soccer League.

International career 
Bradvić played for the Yugoslavia amateur team against West Germany in the UEFA Amateur Cup on 13 May 1978.

Personal life 
Bradvić's sons Mislav and Petar Bradvić also became footballers. Bradvić died on 23 February 2019.

References 

1949 births
2019 deaths
Footballers from Zagreb
Association football midfielders
Yugoslav footballers
GNK Dinamo Zagreb players
HNK Rijeka players
Toronto Croatia players
Toronto Blizzard (1971–1984) players
NK Jedinstvo Bihać players
Buffalo Stallions players
Yugoslav First League players
Canadian National Soccer League players
North American Soccer League (1968–1984) players
Major Indoor Soccer League (1978–1992) players
Yugoslav expatriate footballers
Yugoslav expatriate sportspeople in Canada
Yugoslav expatriate sportspeople in the United States
Expatriate soccer players in Canada
Expatriate soccer players in the United States